Leptophlebiidae is a family belonging to the Ephemeropterans that are commonly known as the prong-gilled mayflies or leptophlebiids. It is the only family in the superfamily Leptophlebioidea. There are around 131 genera and 640 described species.  Leptophlebiids are easily recognized by the forked gills present on the larvae's abdomen, thus their common name.

Larvae
Leptophlebiid larvae live in freshwater streams and lakes eating detritus and/or algae.  North American species generally cling to rocks, few physiologically equipped for skilled swimming.  Like all Ephemeropteran larvae, fragile gills line the lateral margins of their abdomen.  Some genera grow mandibular tusks like their burrowing relatives, the Ephemeridae, Polymitarcyidae, and Potamanthidae.

Selected genera
 Acanthophlebia Towns, 1983
 Atalophlebia
 Choroterpes
 Farrodes
 Habrophlebia
 Habrophlebiodes
 Leptophlebia
 Miroculis
 Neochoroterpes
 Paraleptophlebia
 Thraulodes
 Traverella
 Kachinophlebia Burmese amber, Myanmar, mid-Cretaceous (Albian-Cenomanian).
 Conovirilus Lebanese amber, Early Cretaceous (Barremian)

References

External links

 
Mayflies
Insect families